Dudley Arthur Theophilus (12 May 1911 – 12 May 1936) holds the record as South Africa's youngest first-class cricketer.

Dudley Theophilus was born in Baroe, a small settlement in eastern Cape Province on the railway line between Klipplaat and Kleinpoort, about 150 kilometres inland from Port Elizabeth. Aged 15 years and 309 days, and while attending Grey High School in Port Elizabeth, he made his first-class debut for Eastern Province against Western Province in the 1926–27 Currie Cup. Keeping wickets, he conceded no byes in the match.

Theophilus played regularly for Eastern Province over the next few seasons, and also represented South African Schools against the touring MCC in 1927–28. He died on his 25th birthday.

References

External links
 
 Dudley Theophilus at CricketArchive

1911 births
1936 deaths
People from Sarah Baartman District Municipality
South African cricketers
Eastern Province cricketers
Alumni of Grey High School